Andrew Jackson Beard (1849–1921) was an African American inventor, who introduced five improvements  to the automatic railroad car coupler in 1897 and 1899, and was inducted into the National Inventors Hall of Fame in Akron, Ohio in 2006 for this achievement.

Life and career 

Born in 1849, Andrew Beard spent the first fifteen years of his life as a slave on a small farm in Eastlake, Alabama.  A year after he was emancipated, he married and became a farmer in Pinson, a city just outside Birmingham, Alabama.

In 1872, after working in a flour mill in Hardwicks, Alabama, Beard built his own flour mill, which he operated successfully for many years.  In 1881, he patented a new double plow design that allowed to adjust the distance between the plow plates, which he later sold in 1884 for $4000 (equivalent to almost $100,000 today).  After the sale of his first patent, Beard returned to farming.  In 1887, he patented a second double plow design that allowed for pitch adjustment,, which he sold for $5,200 (equivalent to about $130,000 today), and invested his earnings into real estate.

Following his stint in real-estate, Andrew Beard began to work with and study engines. In 1882, he patented a design for a new rotary steam engine, and took out two patents ( and ). In 1890 and 1892, while living in Woodlawn, Beard patented two improvements to the Janney coupler, (invented by Eli H. Janney in 1873 - ). The coupler  Beard improved was used to hook railroad cars together, and to be operated required the dangerous task of manually placing a pin in a link between the two cars; Beard himself had lost a leg in a car coupling accident. Thanks to his design, the coupling could be now performed automatically. The former was sold for $50,000 in 1897, .

Beard's railroad car coupler improvement included two horizontal jaws, which automatically locked together upon joining.  Beard's improved coupler was the first automatic coupler widely used in the US.  In 1887, the same year Beard's first improvement of the automatic coupler was patented, the US Congress passed the Federal Safety Appliance Act, which made it illegal to operate any railroad car without automatic couplers.

Little is known about the period of time from Beard's last patent application in 1897 up until his death, but he reportedly became paralyzed and impoverished in his later years.  He died in 1921.

References

External links
 Biography of Beard from IEEE
 Andrew Beard from the Black Inventor Online Museum
Biography of Beard from the Encyclopedia of Alabama
Biography of Beard from the US department of transportation

1849 births
1921 deaths
American people in rail transportation
African-American inventors
19th-century American inventors
19th-century American slaves
20th-century African-American people